Chems-Eddine Chitour is an Algerian scholar, researcher and author. He took office as Minister of Energy Transition and Renewable Energies on June 24, 2020. He previously served as minister of Higher Education and Scientific Research from January the 4th to June 24, 2020 in Algeria.

Career 
He graduated from the National Polytechnic School and the Algerian Institute of petroleum in Algiers, in the field of Chemistry. He did his doctorate "Es Sciences" at the Université Jean Monnet in France. He is the founder of valorization of fossil energy research laboratory. He worked as a professor and assisting professor at "IGC" and then ENSIACET in the city of Toulouse in France. He published several scholarly articles and books.

Chitour took office on 4 January 2020 as Minister of Higher Education and Scientific Research.

References 

Living people
Algerian academics
Government ministers of Algeria
Year of birth missing (living people)
Place of birth missing (living people)
Education ministers of Algeria
Jean Monnet University alumni
21st-century Algerian people